Bear Behaving Badly is a children's comedy which aired on  CBBC and starred Nev the Bear and Barney Harwood.

Series overview

Episodes

Season 1 (2007)

Season 2 (2008-2009)

Season 3 (2009)

Season 4 (2010)

External links
 

Lists of British children's television series episodes
Lists of British comedy television series episodes